The Ice Hockey Federation of Slovenia (HZS) is the governing body of ice hockey in Slovenia. Slovenia was one of ten nations to join the International Ice Hockey Federation on May 6, 1992, the largest number of nations to join in one day in the history of the organization.

References

External links

Slovenia at IIHF.com

Ice hockey in Slovenia
Slovenia
International Ice Hockey Federation members
Sports governing bodies in Slovenia
Sports organizations established in 1946
1946 establishments in Yugoslavia